Cobalt oleate is an organometallic compound with the formula Co(C18H33O2)2. When cobalt oleate is added to non-polar solvents, the viscosity rapidly increases, and then continues increasing over time. This unusual viscosity effect is caused by the formation of a weak coordination complex with the solvent molecules.

Preparation 
Cobalt oletate can be synthesized by heating a solution of sodium oleate and cobalt(II) chloride to 70 °C.

2NaC18H33O2 + CoCl2 -> 2NaCl + Co(C18H33O2)2

See also 

 Oleic acid

References 

Cobalt(II) compounds
Organocobalt compounds